The AO-27 was a Soviet assault rifle, chambered for the 7.62 mm fin-stabilized flechette sabot round. The flechette itself had a body diameter of 3 mm. The overall length of the round was 63 mm, and the flechette 55 mm. The weight of the round was 10.5 grams, with 2.4 grams the weight of the flechette.

See also
List of assault rifles

References

Flechette firearms
Kalashnikov derivatives
Assault rifles of the Soviet Union
Trial and research firearms of the Soviet Union